Miriam Ziv was the first female ambassador of Israel to Canada, from 2003 until 2008.  Other firsts in her career include being the first deputy director general (Africa) of the Ministry of Foreign Affairs. Later, she served as Deputy Director General for Strategic Affairs at the Ministry.

She was listed as one of the 25 most influential people in Canadian politics by Maclean’s.

Ziv studied English linguistics and political science at Tel Aviv University.

References

Living people
Israeli women ambassadors
Ambassadors of Israel to Canada
Tel Aviv University alumni
Year of birth missing (living people)